The Cole–Cole equation is a relaxation model that is often used to describe dielectric relaxation in polymers.
 
It is given by the equation

The exponent parameter , which takes a value between 0 and 1, allows the description of different spectral shapes. When , the Cole-Cole model reduces to the Debye model. When , the relaxation is stretched. That is, it extends over a wider range on a logarithmic  scale than Debye relaxation.

The separation of the complex dielectric constant  was reported in the original paper by Kenneth Stewart Cole and Robert Hugh Cole as follows:

Upon introduction of hyperbolic functions, the above expressions reduce to:

Here .

These equations reduce to the Debye expression when .

Cole–Cole relaxation constitutes a special case of Havriliak–Negami relaxation when the symmetry parameter , that is, when the relaxation peaks are symmetric. For an abridged and updated review of anomalous dielectric relaxation in disordered systems, see Kalmykov.

References

Further reading 
 
 

Electric and magnetic fields in matter